The Romanian Democratic Convention (abbreviated CDR) was an electoral alliance of several democratic, anti-Communist, anti-totalitarian, and centre-right political parties in Romania, active from 1991 until 2000. The most prominent leaders of the CDR throughout the 1990s were by far Corneliu Coposu, Ion Rațiu, and Ion Diaconescu, all three members of the Christian Democratic National Peasants' Party (PNȚCD) - successor and political heir to the National Peasants' Party (PNȚ), active in the Kingdom of Romania between 1926 and 1948). 

The name of the CDR was coined by Sergiu Cunescu, the leader of the Romanian Social Democratic Party (PSDR), as stated in a late 1990s interview by former PNL re-founding president Radu Câmpeanu at Marius Tucă Show by talk show journalist Marius Tucă.

History

Political composition 

The core members of the CDR included the following political parties:

 Christian Democratic National Peasants' Party (PNȚCD): (1991–2001);
 Ecologist Federation of Romania (FER): (1991–2001);
 Romanian Ecologist Party (PER): (1991–2000);
 Civic Alliance Party (PAC): (1991–1995);
 Romanian Social Democratic Party (PSDR): (1991–1995);
 Democratic Alliance of Hungarians in Romania (UDMR/RMDSZ): (1991–1992, 1992–1995);
 National Liberal Party (PNL): (1991–1992, 1993–1999);
 National Liberal Party-Democratic Convention (PNL-CD): (1992–1997);
 National Liberal Party-Youth Wing (PNL-AT): (1992–1993);
 Liberal Party '93 (PL ’93): (1993–1995);
 Union of Right-leaning Forces (PAR, then UFD): 1996–2001;
 National Christian Democratic Alliance (ANCD): (1999–2001);
 The Moldavians' Party (PM): (1999–2001).

Eventually, some parties left (more specifically, the main faction of the PNL between 1992 and 1996, as well as the PAC, PSDR, and UDMR/RMDSZ in 1995), while other minor parties joined or were created between mergers within the alliance such as the Liberal Party '93 (PL '93) or the Union of Right-leaning Forces (UFD).

1991–1992: Foundation 

CDR was founded in 1991, one year before the 1992 elections, mainly by the PNŢCD and the National Liberal Party (PNL). In addition, aside from the aforementioned political forces, several other noteworthy civic and cultural organisations, foundations, and other minor political parties were involved in the foundational process.

Initially, the planned name of the CDR was "The National Convention for Democracy Implementation". Subsequently, the main purpose of the CDR was to amount an effective opposition against the then all-dominating National Salvation Front (FSN), a huge parliamentary bloc made up mostly of former second and third rank members of the Romanian Communist Party (PCR), which assumed leadership of the country shortly after the 1989 Revolution. According to a later interview by Emil Constantinescu, the former President of Romania claimed that the FSN was actually made of former first rank members of the PCR.

1992–1996: Opposition 

For the period 1992–1996, CDR was the main political opposition force in the Parliament of Romania and in the local administration as well. Although the convention won the capital city of Bucharest and much of the larger urban centres at the 1992 local elections, FSN swept over almost all rural areas and small towns.

The alliance also included the UDMR/RMDSZ, which ran on a separate list, and a number of minor parties and civic organisations that failed to gain parliamentary representation: the Democratic Unity Party, the Christian Democratic Union, the Ecologist Federation of Romania (FER), the Civic Alliance (PAC), and others. Prior to the 1992 general elections, the PNL led by Radu Câmpeanu withdrew from the CDR.

At the 1992 general elections, Emil Constantinescu was the presidential candidate of the convention. He managed to qualify in the second round where he finished second with an electoral score of 38.57% (or 4,641,207 votes).

1996–2000: Government

In 1993, the PNL led by Mircea Ionescu-Quintus returned within the CDR. Subsequently, the CDR managed to win the 1996 Romanian elections, and the alliance's presidential candidate, once again Emil Constantinescu, became president with 54.41% (or 7,057,906 votes). The 1996 Romanian general election represented the first peaceful transition of power in the democratic history of Romania after the fall of Communism.

For the period 1996–2000, the CDR formed a grand coalition with the Social Democratic Union (an alliance between the Democratic Party and PSDR) and the UDMR/RMDSZ (Democratic Alliance of Hungarians in Romania). At governing level, this grand coalition resulted in the Ciorbea Cabinet (1996–1998), Vasile Cabinet (1998–1999), and Isărescu Cabinet (1999–2000).

2000–2004: CDR 2000 and extra-parliamentary opposition

Due to internal frictions within the alliance (as well as given the somewhat inconsistent and turbulent governing from 1996 to 2000), the PNL decided to withdraw from the CDR prior to the 2000 general elections. Nonetheless, PNȚCD and other parties ran on the CDR 2000 common list for these elections. The alliance did not manage to score the same positive results as it did during the 1990s and, consequently, shortly disbanded since it did not pass the electoral threshold. However, it expressed extra-parliamentary opposition between 2000 and 2004 towards the minority PDSR government led by Adrian Năstase.

Presidents and notable leaders 

 Corneliu Coposu (PNȚCD, early to mid 1990s);
 Ion Rațiu (PNȚCD, early 1990s);
 Ion Diaconescu (PNȚCD, early to late 1990s);
 Emil Constantinescu (PNȚCD, late 1990s);
 Radu Câmpeanu (PNL, only during the early 1990s);
 Mircea Ionescu-Quintus (PNL, mid to late 1990s);
 Géza Domokos (UDMR/RMDSZ, early 1990s);
 György Frunda (UDMR/RMDSZ, mid 1990s to late 1990s);
 Sergiu Cunescu (PSDR, early to mid 1990s);
 Otto Weber (PER, early to late 1990s);
 Marcian Bleahu (FER, early to late 1990s).

As of 2022, of all the aforementioned leaders of the CDR, only Constantinescu and Frunda are still alive.

Electoral history

Legislative elections 

Notes:

1 CDR members in 1992: PNȚCD (21 senators and 41 deputies), PAC (7 senators and 13 deputies), PNL-AT (1 senator and 11 deputies), PSDR (1 senator and 10 deputies), PNL-CD (4 senators and 3 deputies), and PER (no senators and 4 deputies).

2 CDR members in 1996: PNȚCD (25 senators and 81 deputies), PNL (22 senators and 28 deputies), PNL-CD (1 senator and 4 deputies), PAR (3 senators and 3 deputies), PER (1 senator and 5 deputies), and Ecologist Federation of Romania (FER - 1 senator and 1 deputy).

3 CDR 2000 members: PNȚCD, UFD, Ecologist Federation of Romania (FER), National Christian Democratic Alliance (ANCD), and The Moldavians Party (PM).

Local elections

National results

Mayor of Bucharest

Presidential elections 

Notes:

1 Emil Constantinescu was the common centre-right candidate who was endorsed by the PNȚCD both in 1992 and 1996 as part of the CDR.

2 Mugur Isărescu was endorsed by the PNȚCD at the 2000 elections as part of the re-named CDR 2000 alliance.

Timeline of the political composition of the CDR with all of its constituent parties (1991–2000)

See also 
 Politics of Romania
 List of political parties in Romania

References

Bibliography 
 Dan Pavel, Iulia Huia, <<Nu putem reuşi decît împreună.>> O istorie analitică a Convenţiei Democratice, 1989-2000, Editura Polirom, Iaşi, 2003
 Roper, Steven D., <<From Opposition to Government Coalition: Unity and Fragmentation within the Democratic Convention of Romania.>>, East European Quarterly, 1997. Vol. 31, 4: 519–542.

Defunct political party alliances in Romania